Riđica is a village in Serbia. It is situated in the Sombor municipality, in the West Bačka District, Vojvodina province. The village has a Serb ethnic majority and its population numbering 2,590 people (2002 census).

Geography

Riđica is the northernmost settlement of the Sombor municipality; it is 2 km away from the border with Hungary. The closest neighbouring settlements are Stanišić, Kruševlje and Rastina.

History

There are remains of the Celtic fort in this area. The earliest historical record of the village dates from 1535, which mentions it as a possession of Katarina Orlović. During the Ottoman rule (16th-17th century), Riđica was populated by Serbs. During Habsburg rule, Hungarians, Slovaks and Germans settled here as well. While Slovaks were mostly magyarized, Germans left from the village after the Second World War as a consequence of war events. As part of the post-World War II colonization.

Ethnic groups (2002 census)

Serbs = 2,165 (83.59%)
Hungarians = 217 (8.38%)
Yugoslavs = 83 (3.21%)
Croats = 63 (2.43%)
Others.

Historical population

1961: 4,291
1971: 3,663
1981: 3,186
1991: 2,806
2002: 2,590

Sport

There are volleyball club "Dalmatinac" and football club "Graničar" in the village.

See also

List of places in Serbia
List of cities, towns and villages in Vojvodina

References

Slobodan Ćurčić, Broj stanovnika Vojvodine, Novi Sad, 1996.

External links

Riđica
Castle of Imre Kovac, Ridjica

Gallery

U7i999

Places in Bačka
Sombor
West Bačka District